State of New York, et al v. Trump et al. (No. 1:17-cv-05228-NGG-JO) is a lawsuit against the rescission implemented by the Trump administration of the Deferred Action for Childhood Arrivals (DACA) program. At issue are Fifth Amendment protections of due process, information use, and equal protection.

Plaintiffs claim damage in the form of "discriminatory treatment based on their national origin, without lawful justification."

Facts and prior history
Obama administration Secretary of Homeland Security Janet Napolitano issued a memorandum establishing DACA on June 15, 2012. This policy protected certain undocumented immigrants who came to the United States as children from arrest or detention based solely on their immigration status while deferred action was in effect. Participation was granted for two years with renewal possible. DACA grantees also got work authorizations and were eligible to receive Social Security, retirement, disability benefits, and, in certain states, benefits such as driver’s licenses or unemployment insurance.

But several years later and in fulfillment of a Trump campaign promises made June 16, 2015 and August 31, 2016 the Acting Secretary of Homeland Security Elaine Duke rescinded the Napolitano memo on September 5, 2017. The Trump administration then sent the program to Congress for rework within six months. 

The lawsuit seeks to maintain the protections extended to DACA grantees and to allow renewal and continued enrollment by eligible children.

Latest developments  

The case was reassigned to judge Nicholas G. Garaufis, because it is related to Batalla Vidal et al. v. Baran et al., No. 1:16-cv-4756.

In late September, the parties were arguing over discovery. On October 19, 2017, Judge Garaufis ordered that the Trump Administration cannot delay discovery, but over a reduced scope of documents.

On December 14, 2017, government lawyers argued that discovery was improper. There was no ruling from the court.

References

Donald Trump litigation